Carlos Joaquim "CJ" Antunes dos Santos (born August 24, 2000) is an American professional soccer player who plays as a goalkeeper for Inter Miami in Major League Soccer.

Professional career
Dos Santos began playing football at the age of 2, and continued his development with local soccer academies Foxchase SC, Philadelphia SC, and FC Delco before moving to Philadelphia Union in 2013. In August 2016, he signed with the academy of Benfica in Portugal. Dos Santos made his professional debut with Benfica B in a 1–1 Liga Portugal 2 tie with F.C. Porto B on January 25, 2021.

On February 11, 2022, Dos Santos signed with Major League Soccer side Inter Miami.

International career
Dos Santos was born in the United States to a Cape Verdean father and Portuguese mother. He is a youth international for the United States, having represented the United States U17s at the 2017 CONCACAF U-17 Championship and 2017 FIFA U-17 World Cup. He was called up for a training camp for the senior United States men's national soccer team in December 2020.

References

External links
 
 

2000 births
Living people
Soccer players from Philadelphia
American soccer players
United States men's youth international soccer players
American people of Cape Verdean descent
American people of Portuguese descent
Association football goalkeepers
S.L. Benfica B players
Liga Portugal 2 players
Inter Miami CF players
Inter Miami CF II players
MLS Next Pro players
United States men's under-20 international soccer players